The Moravian Margrave Wars were a turbulent period of fighting, skirmishes, robbery and lawlessness that took place especially in Moravia at the turn of the 14th and 15th centuries.

Prelude 
John Henry, Margrave of Moravia had three notable sons; Jobst, John Sobieslaw, and Prokop. Upon his death, Jobst and John Sobieslaw quarreled over their inheritance, with the latter attacking and illegally occupying estates belonging to Jobst. Their issues were settled in 1377 after mediation by Charles IV. 

After the death of Charles IV in 1378, order began to gradually collapse both in the lands of the Czech Crown and in the Holy Roman Empire. In Moravia at that time, the brothers Jobst and Prokop ruled together. They participated in the joint efforts of the Luxembourg dynasty to obtain the Polish and Hungarian crowns. They financially supported their cousin Sigismund of Luxemburg in obtaining the Hungarian crown. The Czech king Wenceslaus IV also sought financial help from his Moravian cousins.

First Margrave War
After the death of John Sobieslaw, Jobst and Prokop had a dispute about the inheritance. Fighting began in 1381, and Prokop conquered Tepenec Castle (with the help of his commanders Jindřich of Nevojice and Unka of Majetín). Prokop attempted to take control Olomouc, but failed. The dispute ended in September of 1382. 

The elder Margrave Jobst settled with Prokop and his property and paid him a sum of kopecks per year. However, after a period of relative calm and cooperation in the 1380s, a power struggle within the Luxembourg dynasty began.

Second Margrave War
In the 1390s, two coalitions began to form. One of King Wenceslas IV, Margrave Prokop, and Polish King Władysław II Jagiełło, and one of Hungarian King Sigismund, Moravian Margrave Jošt, and Albert III, Duke of Austria.

Jobst and Prokop again began warring in 1393. They fought not only in Moravia, but also in Brandenburg with their alliances. The brothers fought in Poland as well, with Jobst supporting  and Prokop supporting Władysław II Jagiełło. Peace negotiations began in October 1393, but fell through after the poisoning of Wenceslaus and Frederick, Duke of Bavaria. Frederick died, and suspicion fell on Sigismund and Jobst. That December, Jobst secured an alliance with William I, Margrave of Meissen.

While the majority of the Moravian lords took Jobst's side, Prokop gained allies in northern Moravia and Silesia. Anarchy began in Moravia, during which many nobles turned into robber knights and raided not only the castles and villages of their opponents, but also the wagons of merchants. They also took hostages from whose relatives they demanded ransom. 

In 1394, the League of Lords captured and imprisoned the Wenceslaus. Jobst was declared provincial governor, and Prokop and John of Görlitz sought to release Wenceslaus. Peace was reached in 1396.

Third Margrave War 

The war resumed in 1398, reignited by Prokop. After the death of the Olomouc bishop , Wenceslaus commissioned Prokop to manage the bishop's estates during the sede vacante. Prokop had all the bishop's castles occupied by his garrison and they thus became the support of Wenceslas. The chapter defended itself by reporting the seizure of the episcopal estates to the Pope.  Prokop and his supporters were excommunicated in 1399. 

Prokop seized territory, and his commander John Sokol of Lamberg began to raid around Moravia. In December of 1399, Sigismund and his army crossed into Moravia after , the bishop of Olomouc, requested aid. He successfully besieged Tepenec Castle among others. 

There was a brief interruption after Sigismund left Moravia and was subsequently captured by the local nobility.  

The  occurred in February 1402, and was a failure for the commanders John Sokol and Zikmund of Křižanova. 

In March 1402, Wenceslas was captured by his brother Sigismund. In June, by the joint action of Sigismund and Jobst, Prokop was also lured out of Bezděz by trickery and then captured and imprisoned. In the same year, however, there was also a fundamental turn in Jobst's politics. He broke with Sigismund and hinted to him that he was considering ruling Bohemia himself. In the lands of the Czech crown, he took the side of Wenceslas and established a connection with the opposition in Hungary against Sigismund. 

Sigismund allied himself with Albert IV, Duke of Austria and in 1403, an uprising broke out in Hungary. Sigismund's and Albrecht's troops subsequently withdrew from Moravia and participated in its suppression. At the end of 1403, John II of Liechtenstein succeeded in helping Wenceslas escape from prison in Vienna, who then overthrew the government installed by Sigismund.

The city was held by Prokop's governors John Sokol and Hynek I Suchý Čert. After two months the siege was lifted as both Sigismund and Albrecht were poisoned. While Sigismund recovered, Albrecht died. Jobst, Wenceslaus, and Sigismund signed for peace in the spring of 1405. Margrave Prokop was released from his prison in the Carthusian monastery in Brno, but soon after, on September 4, 1405, he died as a result of his stay in prison.

Aftermath 
After the death of Prokop, Jobst of Luxemburg became the sole lord of Moravia and gradually came to terms with his cousins Wenceslaus and Sigismund. At the end of 1410, he briefly became King of the Romans, but he died in January 1411. Since he died like his brother Prokop without descendants, Moravia and the title of margrave went to the Czech king Wenceslas IV. He permanently united the Czech Kingdom and the Moravian Margraviate in the person of one ruler. He confirmed their freedom to the Moravians and appointed his hofmeister  as provincial governor.

Notes

References 
 
 
 
 
 ELBEL, Petr - JAN, Libor - JUROK, Jiří. Z počátků husitské revoluce. Brno: Matice moravská, 2019. 380 s. .
 
 
 
History of Moravia